Abolition of Forced Labour Convention, 1957, the full title of which is Convention concerning the Abolition of Forced Labour, 1957 (No. 105), is one of the eight ILO fundamental conventions of the International Labour Organization, which cancels certain forms of forced labour still allowed under the Forced Labour Convention of 1930, such as punishment for strikes and as a punishment for holding certain political views.

In order to implement the 1930 Forced Labour Convention and the 1957 Abolition of Forced Labour Convention, the Special Action Programme to Combat Forced Labour was set up.

Ratifications
, the Convention has been ratified by 178 of the 187 ILO members. Nine ILO members have not ratified the Convention:

Brunei
East Timor
Laos
Marshall Islands
Myanmar
Palau
South Korea
Tonga
Tuvalu

Two countries that had ratified the Convention (Malaysia and Singapore) have since denounced it. In addition, seven members of the United Nations are not members of the ILO and thus are not eligible to ratify the Convention unless they first join the ILO: Andorra, Bhutan, Liechtenstein, Micronesia, Monaco, Nauru, and North Korea.

In China and Japan, the Convention has not yet entered into force: Japan had ratified it on 19 July 2022 and will enter into force on on 19 July 2023; China had ratified it on 12 August 2022 and will enter into force on 12 August 2023.

References

External links 

 
 Text of the Convention at the ILO site.
 The ILO Special Action Programme to Combat Forced Labour (SAP-FL)

Unfree labour
International Labour Organization conventions
Treaties entered into force in 1959
Treaties concluded in 1957
Treaties of the Kingdom of Afghanistan
Treaties of Albania
Treaties of Algeria
Treaties of the People's Republic of Angola
Treaties of Antigua and Barbuda
Treaties of Argentina
Treaties of Armenia
Treaties of Australia
Treaties of Austria
Treaties of Azerbaijan
Treaties of the Bahamas
Treaties of Bahrain
Treaties of Bangladesh
Treaties of Barbados
Treaties of Belarus
Treaties of Belgium
Treaties of Belize
Treaties of the Republic of Dahomey
Treaties of Bolivia
Treaties of Bosnia and Herzegovina
Treaties of Botswana
Treaties of the military dictatorship in Brazil
Treaties of Bulgaria
Treaties of Burkina Faso
Treaties of Burundi
Treaties of Cambodia
Treaties of Cameroon
Treaties of Canada
Treaties of Cape Verde
Treaties of the Central African Republic
Treaties of Chad
Treaties of Chile
Treaties of China
Treaties of Colombia
Treaties of the Comoros
Treaties of the Democratic Republic of the Congo
Treaties of the Republic of the Congo
Treaties of the Cook Islands
Treaties of Costa Rica
Treaties of Ivory Coast
Treaties of Croatia
Treaties of Cuba
Treaties of Cyprus
Treaties of the Czech Republic
Treaties of Denmark
Treaties of Djibouti
Treaties of Dominica
Treaties of the Dominican Republic
Treaties of Ecuador
Treaties of the United Arab Republic
Treaties of El Salvador
Treaties of Equatorial Guinea
Treaties of Eritrea
Treaties of Estonia
Treaties of Ethiopia
Treaties of Fiji
Treaties of Finland
Treaties of France
Treaties of Gabon
Treaties of the Gambia
Treaties of Georgia (country)
Treaties of West Germany
Treaties of Ghana
Treaties of the Kingdom of Greece
Treaties of Grenada
Treaties of Guatemala
Treaties of Guinea
Treaties of Guinea-Bissau
Treaties of Haiti
Treaties of Honduras
Treaties of Hungary
Treaties of Iceland
Treaties of India
Treaties of Indonesia
Treaties of Pahlavi Iran
Treaties of the Iraqi Republic (1958–1968)
Treaties of Ireland
Treaties of Israel
Treaties of Italy
Treaties of Jamaica
Treaties of Japan
Treaties of Jordan
Treaties of Kazakhstan
Treaties of Kenya
Treaties of Kiribati
Treaties of Kuwait
Treaties of Kyrgyzstan
Treaties of Latvia
Treaties of Lebanon
Treaties of Lesotho
Treaties of Liberia
Treaties of the Kingdom of Libya
Treaties of Lithuania
Treaties of Luxembourg
Treaties of North Macedonia
Treaties of Madagascar
Treaties of Malawi
Treaties of the Maldives
Treaties of Mali
Treaties of Malta
Treaties of Mauritania
Treaties of Mauritius
Treaties of Mexico
Treaties of Moldova
Treaties of Mongolia
Treaties of Montenegro
Treaties of Morocco
Treaties of the People's Republic of Mozambique
Treaties of Namibia
Treaties of Nepal
Treaties of the Netherlands
Treaties of New Zealand
Treaties of Nicaragua
Treaties of Niger
Treaties of Nigeria
Treaties of Norway
Treaties of Oman
Treaties of Pakistan
Treaties of Panama
Treaties of Papua New Guinea
Treaties of Paraguay
Treaties of Peru
Treaties of the Philippines
Treaties of the Polish People's Republic
Treaties of the Estado Novo (Portugal)
Treaties of Qatar
Treaties of Romania
Treaties of Rwanda
Treaties of Saint Kitts and Nevis
Treaties of Saint Lucia
Treaties of Saint Vincent and the Grenadines
Treaties of Samoa
Treaties of San Marino
Treaties of São Tomé and Príncipe
Treaties of Saudi Arabia
Treaties of Senegal
Treaties of Serbia and Montenegro
Treaties of Seychelles
Treaties of Sierra Leone
Treaties of Slovakia
Treaties of Slovenia
Treaties of the Solomon Islands
Treaties of the Somali Republic
Treaties of South Africa
Treaties of South Sudan
Treaties of Russia
Treaties of Francoist Spain
Treaties of Sri Lanka
Treaties of the Democratic Republic of the Sudan
Treaties of Suriname
Treaties of Eswatini
Treaties of Sweden
Treaties of Switzerland
Treaties of Tajikistan
Treaties of Thailand
Treaties of Togo
Treaties of Trinidad and Tobago
Treaties of Tunisia
Treaties of Turkey
Treaties of Turkmenistan
Treaties of Uganda
Treaties of Ukraine
Treaties of the United Arab Emirates
Treaties of the United Kingdom
Treaties of the United States
Treaties of Uruguay
Treaties of Uzbekistan
Treaties of Vanuatu
Treaties of Venezuela
Treaties of Vietnam
Treaties of the Yemen Arab Republic
Treaties of Zambia
Treaties of Zimbabwe
Treaties of Tanganyika
Treaties extended to the Netherlands Antilles
Treaties extended to Aruba
Treaties extended to Ruanda-Urundi
Treaties extended to the Faroe Islands
Treaties extended to Greenland
Treaties extended to the Cook Islands
Treaties extended to Niue
Treaties extended to Tokelau
Treaties extended to the Colony of Aden
Treaties extended to Bermuda
Treaties extended to British Honduras
Treaties extended to the Bechuanaland Protectorate
Treaties extended to the Colony of North Borneo
Treaties extended to British Somaliland
Treaties extended to Brunei (protectorate)
Treaties extended to British Cyprus
Treaties extended to the Falkland Islands
Treaties extended to the Colony of Fiji
Treaties extended to the Gambia Colony and Protectorate
Treaties extended to Gibraltar
Treaties extended to Guernsey
Treaties extended to British Guiana
Treaties extended to Jersey
Treaties extended to British Kenya
Treaties extended to the Gilbert and Ellice Islands
Treaties extended to Basutoland
Treaties extended to the Federation of Rhodesia and Nyasaland
Treaties extended to the Crown Colony of Malta
Treaties extended to the Isle of Man
Treaties extended to British Mauritius
Treaties extended to the Colony and Protectorate of Nigeria
Treaties extended to Saint Helena, Ascension and Tristan da Cunha
Treaties extended to the Colony of Sarawak
Treaties extended to the Crown Colony of Seychelles
Treaties extended to the Colony of Sierra Leone
Treaties extended to the Crown Colony of Singapore
Treaties extended to the British Solomon Islands
Treaties extended to Swaziland (protectorate)
Treaties extended to the Colony of the Bahamas
Treaties extended to Tanganyika (territory)
Treaties extended to the West Indies Federation
Treaties extended to the Uganda Protectorate
Treaties extended to the Sultanate of Zanzibar
Treaties extended to the British Virgin Islands
Treaties extended to New Caledonia
Treaties extended to French Polynesia
Treaties extended to Norfolk Island
Treaties extended to the Aden Protectorate
1957 in labor relations
June 1957 events